The British Numismatic Society exists to promote the study and understanding of British numismatics. The Society was founded in 1903, focusing on all forms of coinage, tokens, banknotes and medals relating to the British Isles and former parts of the British Empire. The society promotes the understanding of numismatics through holding regular lectures and meetings as well as producing a number of publications. These include the British Numismatic Journal, the major journal for British numismatics.

Publications

Its principal publication is the British Numismatic Journal (BNJ), published from 1903. Back issues of BNJ are free to read online, apart from the most recent three years' editions.

Library
The BNS has the library combined and integrated with the library of the Royal Numismatic Society and located at the Warburg Institute.

Membership
Becoming a member of the British Numismatic Society is open to all for a £15 fee that covers the first two years of membership. Members have access to the Society's literature on coins and receive a copy of its annual journal.

Awards
Sanford Saltus Gold Medal
Blunt Prize
North Book Prize

See also
List of presidents of the British Numismatic Society

References

External links
Official website of the BNS

1903 establishments in the United Kingdom
Organizations established in 1903
Clubs and societies in the United Kingdom